The 2014–15 Färjestad BK season was Färjestad BK's 40th season in the Swedish Hockey League (formerly known as Elitserien), the top ice hockey division in Sweden.

Pre-season

Champions Hockey League

Standings

Pre-season games

Regular season

Player statistics

Skaters
Skaters

Goaltenders

Transactions

2014–15 SHL season
2014-15